Trail of the Rustlers is a 1950 American Western film directed by Ray Nazarro and starring Charles Starrett, Gail Davis and Tommy Ivo. It is part of the Durango Kid series of films. It is also known by the alternative title Lost River.

The film's sets were designed by the art director Charles Clague. It was shot at the Iverson Ranch.

Plot
Kindly Mrs. Mahoney is actually the mastermind behind a scheme to acquire all the ranch land in the valley. Her sons and their henchmen use violence to get the ranchers to sell with her son Chick impersonating the Durango Kid who leads the attacks on the ranchers.

Cast
 Charles Starrett as Steve Armitage / The Durango Kid 
 Gail Davis as Mary Ellen Hyland 
 Tommy Ivo as Todd Hyland 
 Mira McKinney as Mrs. J.G. Mahoney 
 Don C. Harvey as Chick Mahoney
 Eddie Cletro as Guitar Player 
 The Roundup Boys as Musicians 
 Smiley Burnette as Smiley Burnette 
 Myron Healey as Ben Mahoney
 Gene Roth as Sheriff Dave Wilcox

References

Bibliography
 Pitts, Michael R. Western Movies: A Guide to 5,105 Feature Films. McFarland, 2012.

External links
 

1950 films
1950 Western (genre) films
1950s English-language films
American Western (genre) films
Films directed by Ray Nazarro
Columbia Pictures films
American black-and-white films
1950s American films